Avalon is an unincorporated community in Carroll County, Mississippi, United States.

Avalon is located on the former Yazoo and Mississippi Valley Railroad and was at one time home to a general store.

A post office first began operation under the name Avalon in 1908.

Mississippi John Hurt, an African-American blues musician, was raised and lived here most of his life. His shotgun house is preserved as a museum to honor him. It occasionally hosts blues and gospel festivals on the adjacent land.

Carroll County has placed a highway marker at Avalon to commemorate Hurt and his music. It is part of the Mississippi Blues Trail.

Dardanelle Hadley, a jazz pianist, vibraphonist, and singer, was born in Avalon.

References

Unincorporated communities in Mississippi
Unincorporated communities in Carroll County, Mississippi
Greenwood, Mississippi micropolitan area